Florian Jouanny (born 2 February 1992) is a French Para-cyclist who represented France at the 2020 Summer Paralympics.

Career
Jouanny represented France in the men's road time trial H2 event at the 2020 Summer Paralympics and won a gold medal in the H1-H2 road race, a silver medal in the mixed team relay H1–H5, and a bronze medal in the H2 time trial.

Personal life
A skiing accident in 2011 resulted in quadriplegia.

References

External links
 

Living people
1992 births
People from Échirolles
French male cyclists
Cyclists at the 2020 Summer Paralympics
Medalists at the 2020 Summer Paralympics
Paralympic medalists in cycling
Paralympic silver medalists for France
Paralympic cyclists of France
Sportspeople from Isère
Cyclists from Auvergne-Rhône-Alpes
20th-century French people
21st-century French people